The Nasty Girl is a 1990 West German drama film based on the true story of Anna Rosmus. The original German title loosely translates as "The Terrible Girl."

The film was selected as the German entry for the Best Foreign Language Film at the 63rd Academy Awards, in which it was nominated for.

Plot
A German high school student, Sonja (Lena Stolze as a fictionalized version of Anna Rosmus) wins an essay contest and goes on a trip to Paris. Martin Wegmus begins teaching physics at Sonja's school and one of Sonja's classmates falls in love with him.  Almost by luck, Mr. Wegmus and Sonja kiss. The teacher promises to return for her. The next year, she enters the contest again. She chooses "My Town During the Third Reich" from the possible topics. Her research leads her to discover that her picture-perfect town had been intimately involved in the Third Reich and that nearly all of the city's prominent families were members of the Nazi party long before it came to power. As she digs further, local authorities stonewall her efforts.

Sonja persists and learns that there had been eight concentration camps in the area and that all the Jews were forced out of the town and had their property confiscated. Sonja marries Martin and the townsfolk think Sonja has dropped the issue of Nazi involvement. Sonja bears two daughters and studies history at the University. She resumes her research into the town's Nazi past and wins court cases granting her access to archives. She still has to employ trickery to get the information she wants.  The townsfolks' hostility grows from verbal abuse, to death threats to physical assaults as they attempt to silence her with increasing desperation but nothing deters her. Her husband feels emasculated as he's forced to take care of the children.  The family survives a bomb attack but Sonja keeps up her research. At the end, the townspeople change their tune, even putting a bust of Sonja at the town hall.  Sonja sees this as a means to silence her and rejects the honor.

Cast
 Lena Stolze as Sonja
 Hans-Reinhard Müller as Juckenack
 Monika Baumgartner as Sonja's mother
 Elisabeth Bertram as Sonja's grandma
 Michael Gahr as Paul Rosenberger
 Robert Giggenbach as Martin
 Fred Stillkrauth as Sonja's uncle
 Barbara Gallauner as Miss Juckenack
 Udo Thomer as Archivist Schulz

Awards
 BAFTA Award for Best Film not in the English Language
 Berlin International Film Festival: Silver Bear for Best Director (Michael Verhoeven)
 New York Film Critics Circle Awards for Best Foreign Language Film

Award nominations
 Academy Award for Best Foreign Language Film
 Golden Bear, Berlin Film Festival
 Golden Globe Award for Best Foreign Language Film

See also
 List of submissions to the 63rd Academy Awards for Best Foreign Language Film
 List of German submissions for the Academy Award for Best Foreign Language Film

References

External links
 
 
 

1990 films
1990 drama films
German drama films
West German films
1990s German-language films
Films à clef
German films based on actual events
Films directed by Michael Verhoeven
Best Foreign Language Film BAFTA Award winners
Biographical films about writers
Films set in West Germany
1990s German films